Philippe Séguin (21 April 1943 – 7 January 2010) was a French political figure who was President of the National Assembly from 1993 to 1997 and President of the Cour des Comptes of France from 2004 to 2010.

He entered the Court of Financial Auditors in 1970, but he began a political career in the Neo-Gaullist party RPR. In 1978, he was elected to the National Assembly as a deputy for the Vosges département. He was Mayor of Épinal between 1983 and 1997.

Representing the social tradition of the Gaullism, he was Minister of Social Affairs in Jacques Chirac's cabinet, from 1986 to 1988.
After Chirac's defeat at the 1988 presidential election, he allied with Charles Pasqua and criticized the abandonment of Gaullist doctrine by the RPR executive. He accused Alain Juppé and Édouard Balladur of wanting an alignment on liberal and pro-European policies.

In 1992, he played a leading role in the No campaign against the Maastricht Treaty. On the eve of the vote he opposed President François Mitterrand in a televised debate.

As president of the National Assembly from 1993 to 1997, he supported the winning candidacy of Jacques Chirac at the 1995 presidential election. He inspired the theme of Chirac's campaign which was named "the social fracture".

Their relations deteriorated when he took the lead of the RPR, after the right-wing defeat at the 1997 legislative election. He failed to change the name of the party to "The Rally". He criticized the ascendancy of President Chirac within the party, refusing to be the leader of a "Chirac's fan-club". He resigned in 1999 just before the European elections, leaving his deputy Nicolas Sarkozy in charge.

As the RPR's official candidate, he lost the 2001 mayoral election in Paris. Refusing the merger of the Neo-Gaullist party with the right-wing classical forces in the Union for a Popular Movement, he quit politics in 2002.

He died at the age of 66 on 7 January 2010 from a heart attack.

Political career

President of the Court of Audit of France : 2004-2010 (Death).

Governmental function

Minister of Social Affairs and Employment : 1986–1988.

Electoral mandates

National Assembly

President of the National Assembly of France : 1993–1997.
Vice-president of the National Assembly of France : 1981–1986.
Member of the National Assembly of France for Vosges (1st constituency) : 1978–1986 / 1988–2002. Elected in 1978, reelected in 1981, 1986, 1988, 1993, 1997.

Regional Council

Vice-president of the Regional Council of Lorraine : 1979–1983.
Regional councillor of LorraineLorraine : 1979–1986.

Municipal Council

Mayor of Épinal : 1983–1997 (resigned).
Municipal councillor of Épinal : 1983–1997 (resigned).
Councillor of Paris : 2001–2002 (resigned).

Political functions

President of the Rally for the Republic : 1997–1999 (resigned).

References

External links

Official page
Philippe Seguin - Daily Telegraph obituary
Death of Philippe Séguin, Radio France Internationale in English

1943 births
2010 deaths
People from Tunis
Union for the New Republic politicians
Union of Democrats for the Republic politicians
Rally for the Republic politicians
Government ministers of France
Presidents of the National Assembly (France)
Deputies of the 6th National Assembly of the French Fifth Republic
Deputies of the 7th National Assembly of the French Fifth Republic
Deputies of the 8th National Assembly of the French Fifth Republic
Deputies of the 9th National Assembly of the French Fifth Republic
Deputies of the 10th National Assembly of the French Fifth Republic
Deputies of the 11th National Assembly of the French Fifth Republic
Mayors of places in Grand Est
Sciences Po Aix alumni
École nationale d'administration alumni
Judges of the Court of Audit (France)
Légion d'honneur refusals
Officers of the National Order of Quebec
Grand Cross of the Ordre national du Mérite
Commanders of the Order of Tahiti Nui